John Flood may refer to:

John Flood (academic), UK-Australian legal sociologist
John Flood (cricketer) (1883–1929), Australian born, Irish cricketer
John Flood (footballer, born 1932), English footballer with Southampton and Bournemouth
John Flood (footballer, born 1960), Scottish footballer with Sheffield United, Airdrieonians and Partick Thistle 
John Joe Flood (1899–1982), Irish footballer
John H. Flood (1939–2016), Massachusetts sheriff and politician
John H. Flood Jr. (1878–1958), mining engineer and unpublished Wyatt Earp biographer